Charles Michael Patrick (September 6, 1952 – April 27, 2008) was an American football player who was a punter in the National Football League (NFL) for the New England Patriots from 1975 to 1978. He was born in Austin, Texas, and graduated from Biloxi High School in Biloxi, Mississippi, before playing college football at Mississippi State University. He died at age 55 in Biloxi.

References

1952 births
2008 deaths
American football punters
Mississippi State Bulldogs football players
New England Patriots players
Players of American football from Mississippi
Players of American football from Austin, Texas
Sportspeople from Biloxi, Mississippi